Dublje (Serbian Cyrillic: Дубље) is a village in Serbia. It is located in the Svilajnac municipality, in the Pomoravlje District. According to 2002 census, its population numbers 1,050 people. There is a book about Dublje.

Geography
Dublje is located 3 kilometers from the center of Svilajnac, in the Central Serbia region (GPS: 44.203666, 21.206333). The village is situated on a high plain beneath the hill Hum.

Culture
Dublje (/du:blye/) is well known in the region for having its own unique language which is still spoken in some households today. The Dubljanski language is a mixture of Bulgarian and Serbian language with plenty of Turkish words. Dublje is about two hundred years old, and the settlers came running away from the Turkish people who decapitated many of the former who primarily lived as villagers in Veliki Izvor near today's Zaječar and a few kilometers away from Bulgarian border. So, with their village burned to the ground for the fourth time, the survived villagers became frightened and decided to flee to the west, deeper (Serbian: dublje) and deeper into the woods (which is how Dublje got its name) and founded a settlement on a high plain near the river Resava and today's Svilajnac. The settlers i.e. the people who came from Veliki Izvor entirely preserved their language, customs, family names and even personal names in spite of the new environment and people who surrounded them. The families which kept the same names also kept same slava and even zavetina (slava of the village) remained same in both villages. This instinct for self-preservation went so far that they preserved something better than their ancestors in the primary village. Apart from the language they preserved various rites and other customs and cultural 'products' (songs, legends etc.). Today, some customs, such as 'Lazarice', still last whereas the same custom in Veliki Izvor disappeared even 50 years ago. In Dublje the repeated Lazarice are completely normal for the young girls, who are dressed in their nicest dresses for that occasion, that is on Lazarus Saturday (which is one week before Easter) when they carry a basket and go from house to house collecting eggs and sweets for the approaching Easter; formerly they were dressed in national clothing garment (known as Lazarice) but as the time passed they felt more comfortable with ordinary clothes because Lazarice has a lot of garments with golden coins sown into material and particularly includes heavy wreath for the head with many decorated flowers on it. National clothing also includes other various garments which only the Dubljani (people of Dublje) and the Velikoizvorci (people of Veliki Izvor) wear, like:'zabratka' (women's cap), 'takanici' (men's and women's girdle), 'na prestilki' (women's summer clothing; prestilka means apron), 'na vlnenik' (women's clothing of the recent date), 'fusta' (women's summer clothing), ''eleče' (traditional vest), etc. These clothing are also included when performing line dancing by which the Dubljani are very famous and have several dances on their own; back in the recent past these line dances were extremely popular and were main means of entertainment and making friendships. There are also many folk songs which testify how people lived back in the past. As for the Velikoizvorci (who are the Dubljani’s ancestors), there is one folk song ('Djurdjevdan') recorded about how they used to sacrifice people. Namely, this song tells us how a host, who had no lamb to sacrifice, decided to sacrifice his own first-born son (but fortunately, a lamb appeared in the last moment and the child was saved). Then, there are various customs and ceremonies performed on weddings, deaths and mainly christenings.

In the village, elderly people speak Dubljanski while the young speak Serbian, though they mainly know and understand Dubljanski. Today, it is unthinkable for some parents to teach their children Dubljanski for they are ashamed of it, hence they do not speak Dubljanski at all or at least not in front of their children. The language and traditions are falling into disuse, so eventually the Dubljanski will become a legend.

Features

In the center the village there are few shops, a café Boss, a school, and a new church which is currently under construction. The village is usually a quiet place during the day, when kids are at school and parents are busy farming or at work. But when evening comes the center comes to life when the young and elderly come out in the center to relax and socialize. The younger inhabitants of the village spend their time watching football games or playing pool table at the local cafe, while the older generations play dominoes or chess.

See also
List of places in Serbia

External links

 dublje.com

Populated places in Pomoravlje District